Opa-Loka may refer to:
 "Opa-Loka", a cut on Hawkwind's album Warrior on the Edge of Time
 Opa-locka, Florida, a city in the United States